Waupeton is an unincorporated community in Dubuque County, Iowa, United States.

History
 Waupeton was founded in the 1800s; its population was 50 in 1925.

Notes

Unincorporated communities in Dubuque County, Iowa
Unincorporated communities in Iowa